Katrin Kanitz is a former German pair skater. With partner Tobias Schröter, she won the gold medal at the East German Championships in 1986 and 1987 and the bronze medal at the 1987 European Championships.

In 2016 Kanitz discussed the long-term negative effects of being unknowingly subjected to long-term state-sponsored doping.

Results 
(with Schröter)

References 

1964 births
German female pair skaters
Living people
European Figure Skating Championships medalists